Tryptophan tryptophylquinone (TTQ) is an enzyme cofactor, generated by posttranslational modification of amino acids within the protein.  Methylamine dehydrogenase (MADH), an amine dehydrogenase, requires TTQ for its catalytic function.

See also
 Amicyanin

References

Amino acid derivatives